Robert Lincoln Patterson (August 1, 1887 –  April 2, 1940) served in the California State Assembly for the 56th district from 1927 to 1931 and 48th district from 1931 to 1933 and during World War I he served in the United States Army.

References

United States Army personnel of World War I
1887 births
Republican Party members of the California State Assembly
1940 deaths
20th-century American politicians
Politicians from San Francisco